Quneitra (or al-Qunaytirah) District is one of the two districts of the Quneitra Governorate in southern Syria. It is the northern of the two districts, with Fiq District to the south. Part of Quneitra District has been occupied by Israel since 1967, part has been in the Area of Separation of the U.N. Disengagement Observer Force Zone since 1974, and part is under Syrian control.

The administrative centre is the city of Quneitra. At the 2004 census, the district had a population of 64,680.

Sub-districts
The district of Quneitra is divided into four sub-districts or nawāḥī (population as of 2004):

References

 

 
Districts of Quneitra Governorate